Na Di is a district (amphoe) in the northeastern part of Prachinburi province, eastern Thailand.

Geography
Neighboring districts are (from the south clockwise): Kabin Buri, Prachantakham of Prachinburi Province; Wang Nam Khiao and Khon Buri of Nakhon Ratchasima province; and Mueang Sa Kaeo of Sa Kaeo province.

The Sankamphaeng Range of mountains is in the northern section of this district.

History
Originally the area of the district belonged to Kabin Buri district. When that district was considered to be too large, and to better counter the underground Thai communist party attacks, a minor district (king amphoe) Na Di was established on 15 July 1974 by splitting off tambons Na Di, Sam Phanta, Saphan Hin, and Thung Pho. It was upgraded to full district on 13 July 1981.

Administration
The district is divided into six sub-districts (tambons), which are further subdivided into 63 villages (mubans). Na Di itself is a township (thesaban tambon) which covers parts of tambons Na Di and Samphan Ta. There are a further six tambon administrative organizations (TAO).

References

External links
amphoe.com

Na Di